The Rose City Golf Clubhouse is a building located in northeast Portland, Oregon, listed on the National Register of Historic Places. The building was listed October 31, 2012.

See also

 National Register of Historic Places listings in Northeast Portland, Oregon

References

External links
Rose City Golf Course clubhouse added to historic register
Oregon Historic Sites Database entry

Clubhouses on the National Register of Historic Places in Oregon
Madison South, Portland, Oregon
National Register of Historic Places in Portland, Oregon